Nebojša Simić (born 19 January 1993) is a Montenegrin handball player for MT Melsungen and the Montenegrin national team.

Due to his performance in the 2022 European Men's Handball Championship, he was nicknamed "Minister of Defence" and "Superman Simić" by the Montenegrin fans and famous sports commentator Nebojša Šofranac.

His brother Božidar Simić is also a handball player.

References

External links

1993 births
Living people
Montenegrin male handball players
People from Bar, Montenegro
Expatriate handball players
Montenegrin expatriate sportspeople in Germany
Montenegrin expatriate sportspeople in Sweden
Handball-Bundesliga players
MT Melsungen players
IFK Kristianstad players